Kuranlu may refer to:
 Kuranlu, East Azerbaijan
 Kuranlu, North Khorasan